Schieber is a German surname. Notable people with the surname include:

 Julian Schieber (born 1989), German footballer
 Walter Schieber (1896–1960), Nazi SS officer

See also
 Jass, a card game
 Schiebler

Surnames of German origin